North Shore Football Club may refer to

North Shore Football Club (GFL), an Australian rules football club in the Geelong Football League
North Shore Australian Football Club, an Australian rules football club in the Sydney AFL
Northshore Jets Australian Football Club, an Australian rules football club on the Sunshine Coast, Queensland
North Shore United, an association football club in Auckland, New Zealand